Hullad Moradabadi (29 May 1942 – 12 July 2014) was an Indian poet, humorist and satirist of Hindi language. He had authored several Hindi books including Itni uchi mat chodo, kya karegi chandni, Ye ander ki bat hai, Triveni and Hullad ka Hullad.
He was a poet of Hindi Kavi sammelan.

Early life and background 
Born in Gujranwala, now in Pakistan as Susheel Kumar Chadha on 29 May 1942. He settled in Moradabad, Uttar Pradesh after independence and later shifted to Mumbai. He completed his B.Sc. and later an MA in Hindi.

Literary career 
He shifted to Mumbai in 1977, where he lived for the rest of his years. He also wrote lyrics for Hindi satirical film Nasbandi directed by I. S. Johar, released after the Emergency in 1978. He also acted as a comedian in films Bandhan Baahon Ka (1988) and Santosh (1989).

Moradabadi has written Itni uchi mat chodo, kya karegi chandni, Ye ander ki bat hai, Triveni, Tathakathit bhagwano ke naam (awarded), Hullad ka Hullad,:Hazam ki hazamat and Aacha hai per kabhi kabhi.

Moradabadi's poems have been quoted by several poets in Kavi-Sammelan.

He had several records produced by H.M.V and T-Series and he has been to Hong Kong, Bangkok, Canada, Australia, London, Manchester and America for various Kavi Sammelans.

Books 
Itni uchi mat chodo
Kya Karegi Chandni
Ye Ander Ki Bat Hai
Triveni
Tathakathit bhagwano ke naam (awarded)
Main bhi soochu tu bhi sooch
Hullad ka Hullad
Hazam ki hazamat
Hullad Hazara
Damdar aur doomdar dohe
Jigar Se Bidi Jala Le
Hullad Ki Shrast Hasya Vyang Rachnae
Aacha hai per kabhi kabhi
Hullad ke Jokes

Death 
He died aged 72 on 12 July 2014 in Mumbai after suffering diabetes and a thyroid problem. He left behind a wife, a son-Navneet Chaddha and two daughters.

References

External links 
 Poetry of Moradabadi 
 Moradabadi's poetry on Anubooti
 Books of Moradabadi

1942 births
2014 deaths
Hindi-language writers
Hindi-language poets
People from Moradabad
Indian humorists
Indian literary critics
20th-century Indian poets
Indian male poets
Poets from Uttar Pradesh
20th-century Indian male writers
20th-century pseudonymous writers